Nikoloz Izoria (born August 31, 1985) is a boxer from Georgia.

He participated in the 2004 Summer Olympics for his native country. There he was stopped in the second round of the Flyweight (51 kg) division by Azerbaijan's eventual bronze medalist Fuad Aslanov.

Izoria won the silver medal in the same division six months earlier, at the 2004 European Amateur Boxing Championships in Pula.

At the Olympics 2008 he beat Thato Batshegi 14:4 but lost to Shahin Imranov 9:18.

External links
 Yahoo! Sports

1985 births
Living people
Male boxers from Georgia (country)
Flyweight boxers
Boxers at the 2004 Summer Olympics
Boxers at the 2008 Summer Olympics
Olympic boxers of Georgia (country)
21st-century people from Georgia (country)